Augustin Daly founded or managed several theatres:
Daly's Theatre in London
New York City
Daly's 63rd Street Theatre
Fifth Avenue Theatre
Madison Square Theatre
Daly's Theatre (30th St.), from 1879 to 1920 (demolished); previously operated by the Shubert family (Shubert Brothers Theater Company)